Thoressa masuriensis is a butterfly in the family Hesperiidae. It was described by Frederic Moore in 1878. It is found in the Indomalayan realm (Himalayas, Indochina).

Subspecies
Thoressa masuriensis masuriensis  Himalayas, Assam.
Thoressa masuriensis tali  (Swinhoe, [1912]) Laos, Vietnam, Yunnan

References

External links
 Thoressa at Markku Savela's Lepidoptera and Some Other Life Forms

masuriensis
Butterflies described in 1878